The Gloucestershire Way is a long-distance footpath, in the English county of  Gloucestershire. It was devised by Gerry and Kate Stewart, of the Ramblers Association and Tewkesbury Walking Club. The  route, which uses existing Rights of Way, goes from Tutshill, just north of Chepstow, crosses the river Severn at Gloucester, proceeding then to Tewkesbury, with a 'Worcestershire Way Link'.

In detail the stages are:
Chepstow to Parkend – 
Parkend to May Hill – 
May Hill to Gloucester – 
Gloucester to Crickley – 
Crickley to Salperton – 
Salperton to Stow-on-the-Wold – 
Stow to Winchcombe – 
Winchcombe to Tewkesbury – 
Worcestershire Way Link –

External links
Walking Pages on the Glos Way
Countryside Matters on the Glos Way with basic map

References
Stewart, G.  (1996) The Gloucestershire Way; published by Countryside Matters 

Footpaths in Gloucestershire
Long-distance footpaths in England
County-themed walking routes in the United Kingdom